Justin Rohrwasser (born December 7, 1996) is an American football placekicker who is a free agent. He played college football at Marshall, and was drafted by the New England Patriots in the fifth round of the 2020 NFL Draft.

College career
Rohrwasser played the first two years of his college career at the University of Rhode Island before transferring to Marshall University. At Rhode Island, he made 75% of his field goal attempts and 98% of his extra point attempts. In 2019, in his redshirt senior season with Marshall, he made 85.7% of his kicks with a long of 53 yards.

Professional career
The New England Patriots selected Rohrwasser in the fifth round of the 2020 NFL Draft with the 159th overall pick. The move came a few weeks after they released kicker Stephen Gostkowski, who had been the Patriots kicker since 2006.

In the middle of training camp, the Patriots signed Nick Folk, who had played for the team in 2019, as competition to Rohrwasser. Rohrwasser was waived as part of the team's final cutdowns on September 5, 2020. He was signed to the practice squad the following day. He signed a reserve/future contract on January 4, 2021. On March 23, 2021, Rohrwasser was waived by the Patriots.

Controversy
Upon his selection, Rohrwasser was scrutinized for having a tattoo of the logo of the Three Percenters, a far-right paramilitary group. The Three Percenters have been condemned by the Southern Poverty Law Center and the Anti-Defamation League as a white supremacist hate group. Rohrwasser claimed to have no links to the organization and denounced it. He further claimed that when he received the tattoo he thought the symbol represented military support. Some commentators questioned whether his denial of previous links with the group was authentic. On April 27, 2020, Rohrwasser pledged to have the tattoo removed completely and did so in December 2020.

References

External links
Marshall Thundering Herd bio

Living people
American football placekickers
Marshall Thundering Herd football players
New England Patriots players
People from Clifton Park, New York
Players of American football from New York (state)
Rhode Island Rams football players
1996 births